The 2005–06 Austrian Hockey League season was the 76th season of the Austrian Hockey League, the top level of ice hockey in Austria. Seven teams participated in the league, and EC VSV won the championship.

Regular season

Playoffs

External links
Austrian Ice Hockey Association

Aus
1
Austrian Hockey League seasons